A mason's mitre is a type of mitre joint, traditionally used in stonework or masonry but commonly seen in kitchen countertops. In a mason's mitre, the two elements being joined meet as for a butt joint but a small section of one member is removed creating a socket to receive the end of the other. A small mitre is made at the inside edges of the socket and on the end of the intersecting member so that edge treatments are carried through the joint appropriately.

The mason's mitre allows the appearance of a mitre joint to be created with much less waste than occurs with a common mitre joint, in which triangular sections must be removed from the ends of both joint members.

The terms "back mitre" and "mason's mitre" (or "miter") are often used interchangeably, but are different types of joints, and used for different purposes. Both joints are traditionally used in stone or woodwork. Neither joint requires that one part be coped (or fit) over the other.  In the back mitre, the joints follow the mitre and stile/rail joining lines. In the mason's mitre, the intersecting mouldings are carved within a single stone block or the woodwork's stile, with the rail or adjacent block having a straight profile.

Kitchen worktop protection 

A protective trim for mitre cut kitchen worktops has been patented and created by Pepr products. The product is similar to aluminium trims for straight worktop joints, but shaped to fit mitre cut corner worktops.

References

External links

Joinery
Masonry
Kitchen countertops
Woodworking